Joe Shea (February 7, 1947 – October 19, 2016) was editor-in-chief of The American Reporter,  the first daily Internet newspaper, started on April 10, 1995. Shea was the named plaintiff in the landmark First Amendment case, Shea v Reno, which ended with the Communications Decency Act and its proposed censorship of the Internet declared unconstitutional in Manhattan Federal Court and affirmed in the U. S. Supreme Court in 1997. He is a noted community activist whose efforts to clean up a dangerous neighborhood in Hollywood, California were praised by authorities as a national model for Neighborhood Watch. His defiance of the Clinton Administration on the censorship law was featured in "A Day In the Life of The Internet".

Shea was born in Goshen, New York, to Mr. & Mrs. John S. Shea, Jr., of Monroe and New York City.  His grandfather John S. Shea was elected Sheriff of New York in 1909, the first Republican to be elected in Manhattan since Reconstruction and the last until his uncle, William F. Shea, was elected to the bench in 1954.

Joe Shea also started the Committee to Draft U.S. Senator John Kerry which sought to get the Massachusetts senator into the 1988 Presidential race.

Journalism
Joe Shea started out in journalism by covering the 1968 New York City riot the night of the April 4 assassination of Martin Luther King Jr., submitting his first article in longhand to the Village Voice where it was selected by editor Ross Wetzsteon over 18 other submissions from New Left writers including Dave Dellinger and Michael Harrington. He worked for the Village Voice as a freelance war correspondent in Northern Ireland, India, Vietnam and the Philippines, and was responsible in 1976 for the withdrawal of President Gerald Ford's nomination of Patrick Delaney to the Securities Exchange Commission after the Village Voice published his article revealing inconsistencies in Delaney's resume.

Shea also wrote an article linking Nelson Rockefeller, then Governor of New York, to a Bolivian diplomat, Victor Andrade, whom the U.S. Office of Strategic Services had identified as a "front for Nazis" in the cabinet of Bolivian President Paz Estenssoro. He later worked on the staff at Esquire Magazine, where he was responsible for a suggestion that became a regular feature of the magazine called "Reckless Advice", which became a book by Lee Eisenberg. Shea rolled a coin across his fingers on both hands while tap-dancing and singing "The Impossible Dream" on the Gong Show in 1978, and also wrote about the experience for the Village Voice.

His most important investigative article was a cover story for the L.A. Weekly in Nov., 1989, describing the large influx of monied Iranians into Beverly Hills, where they altered the economic and sociocultural underpinnings of one of the world's wealthiest cities.

In a Village Voice article, "Are Delaney & Son A New Washington Partnership?", Shea told of an extensive stock fraud in which President Gerald Ford's nominee to the Securities Exchange Commission was involved. Patrick Delaney was the son of the ranking bipartisan-endorsed member of the House Rules Committee, Rep. John Delaney.  The article exposed the pair's profit from the fraud and that the younger Delaney had lied about a degree from Georgetown.  The article led to the withdrawal of Delaney's nomination, and the elder Delaney, who admitted to Shea that he "may have" made $100,000 in the Westec stock fraud, chose not to run for office again.  His seat was won by Geraldine Ferraro, who became the first major-party female nominee for vice president just two years later.  The article had the effect of preventing the appointment of an SEC member who might be open to blackmail and of producing a vacancy that was filled by a history-making candidate.

In addition, he wrote for Bert Sugar's Argosy Magazine and many other publications, including the Los Angeles Times, San Francisco Chronicle and Los Angeles Daily News, where he contributed op-ed articles.  He was the executive speech writer consultant at Lockheed Corp. in 1977 as the company sought to make the $800-million "Deal of the Century" for the L1011 passenger jet with Pan Am.  He wrote three speeches, including one broadcast nationally on Town Hall and one to the American Society of Financial Analysts for Lockheed Chairman Roy Anderson, and one for Lockheed President Larry Kitchen, an address to the National Aeronautic Association.  The sale of the L10ll to Pan Am saved the company.

Activism
As a community activist, Joe Shea served for 13 years as president of the Ivar Hill Community Association and was the subject of numerous television documentaries by Fox News and CNN, among others.  The association provided fresh meals and hand-wrapped Christmas gifts for more than 7,000 of Hollywood's poorest children during his years as president. He appeared frequently on television as a community leader and was frequently quoted in the Los Angeles Times during his 10-year effort as leader of the Ivar Hawks Neighborhood Watch to reduce the high rate of violent crime in Hollywood during the 1990s.  LAPD officials hailed the group as a "national model" for Neighborhood Watch and credited the group with at least 16 citizen's arrests of drug dealers.

In 2001, Shea was hailed for his leadership by Los Angeles Police Chief Bernard Parks in an LAPD press release. In addition, Shea was a leading member of the group that put Hollywood's secession on the 2001 Los Angeles city ballot, and was a candidate for the proposed city's city council whose eloquent speech to the county Board of Supervisors in support of cityhood was aired on National Public Radio.  In addition, Shea ran in 2000 as a candidate for Mayor of Los Angeles supporting the secession movement.

Writing and acting
Joe's collection of Shakespearean sonnets, "A Native Music", was published in 1989, and he appeared at the Zephyr Theater in Los Angeles for a three-week run reading a selection of them. He won the Greater Los Angeles Press Club's First Prize for the Best Internet News Story of 2000, in which he revealed the inside secrets of a pyramid scheme and was instrumental in securing seven no-contest pleas from perpetrators of the infamous multimillion-dollar "Family & Friends" fraud.

Shea appeared as The Tourist in the original Brooklyn Academy of Music production of Robert Wilson's 12-hour opera, "The Life and Times of Joseph Stalin", in 1976.

Notes

References
Beneath the Music. Los Angeles Times; 5 May 2003; B.10;
Commentary; Voices: A Forum for Community Issues; Burglar Alarm Issue Whips Up an L.A. Debate; Opposing positions of two residents reflect the division in the community. Los Angeles Times; 25 January 2003; B.23;
Policy Alarms Council; Members vote to reconsider police decision not to respond to unverified alarms.. Patrick McGreevy; Los Angeles Times; 15 January 2003; B.1;
Los Angeles Secession Measures. Los Angeles Times; 7 November 2002; B.13;
Los Angeles; Hollywood Hopefuls Split Up; Council candidates in prospective city form like-minded slates to boost their campaigns.. Nita Lelyveld and Kristina Sauerwein Times Staff Writers; Los Angeles Times; 2 November 2002; B.3;
Los Angeles; Registrar Certifies Contenders. Los Angeles Times; 6 September 2002; B.4;
Hollywood Tryout for Secession to Join Valley Bid on Ballot. NITA LELYVELD and PATRICK McGREEVY; Los Angeles Times; 6 June 2002; A.1;
Los Angeles; ONLY IN L.A.; What Would Students Do for a Chance at $50,000? USC Pranksters Find Out. Steve Harvey; Los Angeles Times; 13 April 2002; B.4;
. Cityhood Is the Talk of Hollywood; Secession: Issue piques residents' interest as decision on possible ballot measure nears.. GEORGE RAMOS; Los Angeles Times; 10 March 2002; B.1;
Trendy Nightspots Helping to Rejuvenate Hollywood; Economy: The new clubs have spurred a bustling street life, but also complaints about the rise in liquor licenses. George Ramos; Los Angeles Times; 15 October 2001; B.1;
Landmark Discovery in Land Down Under. Steve Harvey; Los Angeles Times; 11 April 2001; B.3;
A Snowball's Chance in L.A.; Fringe mayoral candidates who might not have a shot have their say. But will anybody actually hear them?. Martin Miller; Los Angeles Times; 7 March 2001; E.1;
Another L.A. Landmark Lost. Steve Harvey; Los Angeles Times; 22 February 2001; B.3;
METRO NEWS; So Much for Noble Gestures. Steve Harvey; Los Angeles Times; 13 February 2001; B.3;
The Usual Suspects. Al Martinez; Los Angeles Times; 21 January 2001; B.1;
A 9.6 Quake? We Want a Recount. Steve Harvey; Los Angeles Times; 30 November 2000; B.3;
Voices: A Forum for Community Issues; Essay; Democracy Takes Patience. JOE SHEA; Los Angeles Times; 18 November 2000; B.9;
SOUTHERN CALIFORNIA / A news summary; 2 Mayoral Contenders, 3 Secession Leaders to Debate. Los Angeles Times; 14 October 2000; 4;
Brave New Cyberworld. Al Martinez; Los Angeles Times; 19 July 2000; 1;
The Leap From Comic to Angel. Steve Harvey; Los Angeles Times; 8 February 2000; B.2;
This Is Crazy, But You Be the Judge. Steve Harvey; Los Angeles Times; 18 December 1999; 7;
Would You Please Repeat That for the Interpreter?. Steve Harvey; Los Angeles Times; 18 December 1999; 3;
The Speech Was a Lot to Swallow. Steve Harvey; Los Angeles Times; 24 November 1999; 3;
Yo, Ricky, What Are You Doing New Year's Eve?. Steve Harvey; Los Angeles Times; 2 October 1999; 6;
MONTE MORIN; Los Angeles Times; 23 August 1999;
Just Another Fishy Urban Folk Tale. Steve Harvey; Los Angeles Times; 17 August 1999; 3;
Block Beautification Is Permissible Any Old Time. Steve Harvey; Los Angeles Times; 9 July 1999; 3;
Nothing to Hide on Election Day. Steve Harvey; Los Angeles Times; 11 June 1999; 3;
Reading With Children. Los Angeles Times; 14 November 1998; 7;
Drugs Used in Group and Foster Homes. Los Angeles Times; 22 May 1998; 8;
A Little Band of Hawks. Al Martinez; Los Angeles Times; 21 October 1997; 1;
Don't Dismantle Community Policing; LAPD: Parks' plan to put lead officers back on patrol would stall the program's momentum.. JOE SHEA; Los Angeles Times; 9 October 1997; 9;
Police Panel Urges Steps to Fight Gangs; Crime: Comprehensive strategy includes sharing of data among agencies, more job and recreation programs, expanded witness protection. Illegal immigrant issue not addressed.. ROBERT J. LOPEZ;RICH CONNELL; Los Angeles Times; 11 June 1997; 1;
Police Panel Urges Steps to Fight Gangs; Effort: Strategy includes more job and recreation programs, expanded witness protection.. ROBERT J. LOPEZ;RICH CONNELL; Los Angeles Times; 11 June 1997; 1;
THE YEAR IN REVIEW. Los Angeles Times; 5 January 1997; 83;
Only in L.A.. Steve Harvey; Los Angeles Times; 25 September 1996; 4;
Banner Effort; Parthenia Street Neighborhood Employs Signs and a Little Illusion to Battle Street Drug Dealing. BETH SHUSTER; Los Angeles Times; 5 July 1996; 1;
Warning of 'Video Zone' Seeks to Curb Drug Sales; Safety: A Northridge neighborhood has posted banners saying that dealers will be videotaped. But so far, there are no cameras.. BETH SHUSTER; Los Angeles Times; 5 July 1996; 4;
PERSPECTIVE ON GRAFFITI The Explosion of Lives Suppressed Taggers need form and freedom, not blind condemnation by those who can't see the forces that drive them.. JOE SHEA; Los Angeles Times; 8 February 1995; 7;
The explosion of lives suppressed. Shea, Joe; Los Angeles Times; 8 February 1995; B7;
Slaying of Tagger Strikes Deep Chord in Community Crime: Some experts say the support for the gunman is because of outrage over the decay of neighborhoods. Others worry that it may send the wrong message and encourage vigilantism.. JOSH MEYER;DOUG SMITH; Los Angeles Times; 5 February 1995; 1;
Palladium Security Reflects the Reality of Rock 'n' Roll. STEVE HOCHMAN; Los Angeles Times; 14 December 1994; 1;
HOLLYWOOD Halloween Night Takes a Frightening Turn for Officers. SUSAN STEINBERG; Los Angeles Times; 3 November 1994; 11;
HOLLYWOOD Water Erupts From 6 Broken Pipes. Los Angeles Times; 6 October 1994; 9;
AIDS Group Moves Needle Exchange to Private Site Health: Activists who were blocked by citizens arrests during street corner handout will use parking lot of gay and lesbian center.. TINA DAUNT; Los Angeles Times; 22 September 1994; 3;
Citizen's Arrests Halt Distribution of Syringes Health: Neighbors force police to cite group for giving drug users in Hollywood clean needles. The tactic appears to circumvent the mayor's effort to facilitate the program.. TINA DAUNT; Los Angeles Times; 16 September 1994; 3;
HOLLYWOOD A Neighborly Night Out-to Fight Crime. SUSAN STEINBERG; Los Angeles Times; 4 August 1994; 8;
Three Days of Punk, Moshing and Fellowship Pop Beat: `Summer Nationals'-six bands for $6 each night-is Epitaph Records' way of saying thanks to its fans. It's costing the label $100,000, but money isn't the point.. STEVE HOCHMAN; Los Angeles Times; 23 July 1994; 20;
Residents Call for Crackdown on Gangs Along Hollywood Blvd.. SCOTT COLLINS; Los Angeles Times; 5 May 1994; 3;
VIOLENCE IN L.A.: THE LAPD REPORTS The Meanest Streets A Look at Life-and the Perils-in the Most Crime-Ridden Neighborhoods. Los Angeles Times; 1 May 1994; 2;
Shooting at Palladium Brings Calls for Uniformed Officers. KENNETH REICH; Los Angeles Times; 25 April 1994; 1;
A Bigger Role for Neighborhood Watch. Los Angeles Times; 20 February 1994; 24;
Illegal Immigration `It Affects My Day, Everyday' Series: THE GREAT DIVIDE: Immigration in the 1990s; One in a series.. Los Angeles Times; 27 December 1993; 5;
Melee Prompts Calls for Tighter Security at Palladium. BRIAN RAY BALLOU; Los Angeles Times; 22 November 1993; 21;
Palladium to Remain Open Under Tentative City Pact. JAMES RAINEY; Los Angeles Times; 28 April 1993; 1;
Charities Make Mike Milken Their Most-Wanted Man Securities: Many groups are seeking financial help from the former junk bond king sentenced to community service.. JEFF KRAMER; Los Angeles Times; 3 February 1993; 1;
Only in L.A.. Steve Harvey; Los Angeles Times; 6 January 1993; 2;
Overselling of Tickets Blamed for Melee at Palladium Disturbance: Two men are injured at Hollywood club. Police, neighbors say overbooking creates tension.. JESSE KATZ; Los Angeles Times; 27 December 1992; 4;
Only in L.A.. Steve Harvey; Los Angeles Times; 16 September 1992; 2;
Understanding the Riots. Los Angeles Times; 28 May 1992; 6;
Only in L.A.. Steve Harvey; Los Angeles Times; 5 May 1992; 2;
What the Constituents Really Want. BILL BOYARSKY; Los Angeles Times; 24 May 1991; 2;
`Beach' Party Bash Planned as `Memoir'-able Premiere Event. Mary Louise Oates; Los Angeles Times; 7 November 1986; 1

External links
 The American Reporter

1947 births
2016 deaths
American male journalists
People from Goshen, New York